Crepis, commonly known in some parts of the world as hawksbeard or hawk's-beard (but not to be confused with the related genus Hieracium with a similar common name), is a genus of annual and perennial flowering plants of the family Asteraceae superficially resembling the dandelion, the most conspicuous difference being that Crepis usually has branching scapes with multiple heads (though solitary heads can occur). The genus name Crepis derives from the Greek krepis, meaning "slipper" or "sandal", possibly in reference to the shape of the fruit.

The genus is distributed throughout the Northern Hemisphere and Africa, and several plants are known as introduced species practically worldwide. The center of diversity is in the Mediterranean.

Ecology
Crepis species are used as food plants by the larvae of some Lepidoptera species including the broad-barred white moth. The fly Tephritis formosa is known to attack the capitula of this plant.

Seeds of Crepis species are an important food source for some bird species.

Uses
In Crete, Greece the leaves of Crepis commutata which are called  (γλυκοσυρίδα) are eaten raw, boiled, steamed or browned in salads.

Secondary metabolites
The genus Crepis is a rich source of costus lactone-type guaianolides, a class of sesquiterpene lactones.

Phenolics found in Crepis include luteolin-type flavonoids and caffeoyl quinic acid derivatives such as chlorogenic acid and 3,5-dicaffeoylquinic acid. Moreover, Crepis species contain the caffeoyl tartaric acid derivatives caffeoyl tartaric acid and cichoric acid.

Diversity

There are about 200 species in the genus.

Species include:
Crepis acuminata – tapertip hawksbeard, longleaf hawk's-beard
Crepis alpestris
Crepis alpina
Crepis aspera
Crepis atribarba – dark hawk's-beard, slender hawk's-beard
Crepis aurea – golden hawk's-beard
Crepis bakeri – Baker's hawksbeard
Crepis barbigera – bearded hawk's-beard
Crepis biennis – rough hawksbeard
Crepis bungei
Crepis bursifolia – Italian hawksbit
Crepis capillaris – smooth hawksbeard, green crepis
Crepis conyzifolia
Crepis dioscoridis
Crepis foetida – stinking hawksbeard, roadside hawk's-beard
Crepis incana – pink dandelion
Crepis intermedia – limestone hawksbeard, small-flower hawk's-beard
Crepis kotschyana
Crepis micrantha
Crepis modocensis – Modoc hawksbeard, Siskiyou hawksbeard
Crepis mollis – northern hawksbeard
Crepis monticola – mountain hawksbeard
Crepis nicaeensis – French hawksbeard, Turkish hawksbeard
Crepis occidentalis – largeflower hawksbeard, gray hawk's-beard, western hawk's-beard
Crepis palaestina
Crepis paludosa – marsh hawksbeard
Crepis pannonica – pasture hawksbeard
Crepis phoenix
Crepis pleurocarpa – nakedstem hawksbeard, naked hawk's-beard
Crepis pontana
Crepis praemorsa – leafless hawksbeard
Crepis pulchra – small-flower hawk's-beard
Crepis pygmaea – pygmy hawksbeard
Crepis pyrenaica
Crepis rubra – red hawksbeard, pink hawk's-beard
Crepis runcinata – fiddleleaf hawksbeard
Crepis sancta – holy hawksbeard
Crepis setosa – bristly hawksbeard
Crepis sibirica
Crepis sodiroi
Crepis tectorum – narrow-leaved hawksbeard
Crepis thompsonii
Crepis vesicaria – beaked hawksbeard, dandelion hawk's-beard, weedy hawk's-beard
Crepis zacintha – striped hawksbeard

References

External links
USDA Plants Profile of Crepis species in North America
GRIN Species Report on Crepis
Flora of China: Crepis

 
Asteraceae genera
Taxa named by Carl Linnaeus